OpenAPI may refer to:
 Konica Minolta OpenAPI - an API and SDK from the MFP manufacturer Konica Minolta
 Open API - a set of web technologies for inter-website communication
 OpenAPI Specification - a specification and complete framework implementation (formerly named Swagger) for describing, producing, consuming, and visualizing RESTful web services